Zelleria hemixipha is a moth of the family Yponomeutidae. It is found in Australia.

External links
Australian Faunal Directory

Yponomeutidae